David MacKay VC (23 November 1831 – 18 November 1880) was a Scottish recipient of the Victoria Cross (VC), the highest and most prestigious award for gallantry in the face of the enemy that can be awarded to United Kingdom and Commonwealth forces.

Life
Born at Alterwall, Howe, Lyth, Scotland, the son of a farm labourer, he enlisted in the 93rd Highlanders (which became the 93rd Sutherland Highlanders and ultimately the Argyll and Sutherland Highlanders) on 23 December 1850 and served in the Crimean War.

The VC
He was awarded the VC for an action at the Siege of Lucknow during the Indian Mutiny. His citation in the London Gazette dated 24 December 1858 reads:

The medal
The whereabouts of the VC is unknown, Mackay sold it while he was still alive and it was auctioned around 1910.

Memorial
Mackay was awarded the VC in 1857 but was buried in Lesmahagow cemetery in an unmarked grave. A ceremony was held at the cemetery on 14 November 1998 to unveil a marker erected near the grave.

References

Monuments to Courage (David Harvey, 1999)
The Register of the Victoria Cross (This England, 1997)
Scotland's Forgotten Valour (Graham Ross, 1995)

External links
Location of grave and VC medal (Strathclyde)
Pte David MacKay VC (biography & VC action background)
News Item (new memorial plaque)
History of Argyll & Sutherland Highlanders

1831 births
1880 deaths
British recipients of the Victoria Cross
Argyll and Sutherland Highlanders soldiers
Indian Rebellion of 1857 recipients of the Victoria Cross
People from Caithness
British Army personnel of the Crimean War
British Army recipients of the Victoria Cross